Vallonia cyclophorella, common name the silky vallonia, is a species of very small air-breathing land snail, a terrestrial pulmonate gastropod mollusk in the family Valloniidae.

Distribution
This species occurs in areas including:

America:
 British Columbia in Canada
 Montana

References

Valloniidae
Gastropods described in 1892